Håkon Roar Løken (born 3 August 1945) is a Norwegian diver. He was born in Sandefjord.

He competed at the 1972 Summer Olympics in Munich, where he placed 10th in the men's 3 metre springboard.

References

External links

1945 births
Living people
People from Sandefjord
Norwegian male divers
Divers at the 1972 Summer Olympics
Olympic divers of Norway
Sportspeople from Vestfold og Telemark